Miami University Airport  is a public use airport located two nautical miles (3.7 km) west of the central business district of Oxford, a city in Butler County, Ohio, United States. The airport is owned by Miami University but is operated by Cincinnati/Northern Kentucky International Airport.

Facilities and aircraft 
It has one runway designated 5/23 with an asphalt surface measuring 4,011 by 70 feet (1,223 x 21 m).

For the 12-month period ending April 23, 2008, the airport had 16,708 aircraft operations, an average of 45 per day: 99.3% general aviation, 0.6% air taxi, and 0.1% military. At that time there were 10 aircraft based at this airport: 80% single-engine and 20% multi-engine.

References

External links 
 Aerial photo as of 24 March 1998 from USGS The National Map
 

Airports in Ohio
Miami University
Transportation buildings and structures in Butler County, Ohio
University and college airports